Namatjira may refer to:

People
 Albert Namatjira (1902–1959), Australian artist
 Elaine Namatjira, former leading artist at the Hermannsburg Potters, granddaughter of Albert
 Vincent Namatjira (born 1983), Australian artist, great-grandson of Albert

Other uses
 13298 Namatjira, a main-belt asteroid discovered in 1998 
 Electoral division of Namatjira, an electorate in the Northern Territory of Australia
 Namatjira, a theatrical production by Big hART, part of the Namatjira Project
 Namatjira (grasshopper), a genus of grasshoppers in the family Morabidae

See also
 Namatjira the Painter, a 1947 documentary film